The Jones–Sherman House is a historic Bungalow/Craftsman style house built in 1913 in Salem, Oregon, United States.  It was built from a pattern book by Lindstrom & Almars by owner Ralph R. Jones.

The house is also known as the Ralph R. Jones House or Charles L. Sherman House.

It was listed on the National Register of Historic Places in 1981 because of its architectural significance.

References

External links
Historic images of the Jones-Sherman House from the University of Oregon Digital Archives
Jones-Sherman House from Salem architectural historian Virginia Green

Houses on the National Register of Historic Places in Salem, Oregon
Houses completed in 1913
American Craftsman architecture in Oregon
Bungalow architecture in Oregon
1913 establishments in Oregon